Lemvig, with a population of 6,816 (2022), is the main town in Lemvig Municipality, Denmark.

History

Lemvig is a 750-year-old market town, and received its municipal charter in 1545.  One of the landmarks of Lemvig is the town church from the 13th century.  The old town is situated between the Limfjord, a lake  and some hills.  The local topography was shaped during the last ice age.

Geography
Lemvig has a grass airstrip (ICAO: EKLV).

Economy
Lemvig's economy is based on traditional sectors such as metal, wood and furniture industry. Among the largest employers in the town are KK Electronics, Egholm A/S, Cheminova and The Danish Coastal Directorate.

Notable people 

 Jacob Nicolai Wilse (1735 in Lemvig – 1801), Norwegian chronicler and meteorologist
 Herman Bagger (1800 in Lemvig – 1880), Norwegian newspaper editor and politician.
 Carl Johannes With (1877 in Lemvig – 1923), Danish doctor and arachnologist, specialising in pseudoscorpions and mites
 Kai Holm (1896 in Lemvig – 1985), Danish film actor, 41 films between 1927 and 1979 
 Marie Bak, (Danish Wiki) (born 1898) a Danish writer and poet.
 Ruth Smith (1913 – 1958), Faroese artist, lived in Lemvig
 Jens Christian Skou (born 1918 in Lemvig - 2018), medical doctor and winner of the Nobel Prize in Chemistry in 1997
 Elisabeth Møller Jensen (born 1946 in Lemvig), literary historian and feminist, director of KVINFO 1990-2014
 Elof Westergaard (born 1962 in Lemvig), Danish theologian, Bishop of Ribe since 2014
 Sinne Eeg (born 1977 in Lemvig), Danish jazz vocalist and composer.

Sport 
 Iver Schriver (born 1949 in Lemvig), former Danish footballer
 Jannick Green (born 1988 in Lemvig) a Danish handball player; team gold medallist at the 2016 Summer Olympics
 Victor Torp (born 1999 in Lemvig) a Danish footballer, plays for K. V. Kortrijk (loan)
 Mikkel Kallesøe (born 1997 in Lemvig) a Danish footballer, plays for Randers FC
 Max Rasmussen (born 1945 in Lemvig), former Danish footballer
 Søren Krogh (born 1977 in Lemvig), former Danish footballer and now assistant coach for Odense Boldklub

References

External links 

 
Municipal seats of the Central Denmark Region
Municipal seats of Denmark
Cities and towns in the Central Denmark Region
Lemvig Municipality